Chennupati Jagadish  (born 10 August 1957), an Indian-Australian physicist and academic, is the President of the Australian Academy of Science, and a Distinguished Professor of Physics at the Australian National University Research School of Physics. He is head of the Semiconductor Optoelectronics and Nanotechnology Group which he established in 1990. He is also the Convener of the Australian Nanotechnology Network and Director of Australian National Fabrication Facility ACT Node.

Education
Jagadish obtained his B.Sc. degree in physics from Acharya Nagarjuna University (VSR College, Tenali) in 1977, M.Sc. (Tech) in applied physics (with specialization in electronics) from Andhra University in 1980 and M.Phil. and Ph.D. degrees in physics (semiconducting thin films) from the University of Delhi in 1982 and 1986, respectively.

Career 
After completing his PhD in Physics at the University of Delhi, Jagadish worked at Sri Venkateswara College, New Delhi as a Lecturer in Physics and Electronics during 1985–1988. He was a post-doctoral fellow at Queen's University Physics Department during 1988–1990. He moved to the Australian National University in 1990 to join the newly established Department of Electronic Materials Engineering in the Research School of Physics. He has served as Vice-President and Secretary for Physical Sciences of the Australian Academy of Science (2012-2016) and was elected President of the Academy in May 2022, to serve a term of four years until May 2026.

Jagadish also provides services to many other universities around the world as a guest faculty, distinguished faculty and holds honorary positions. Prestigious Universities such as Oxford University, Cambridge University, St. John's College, Cambridge, Nanjing University; Central South University, China, University of Electronic Science and Technology of China, Chengdu, China, Chinese Academy of Sciences, CIOMP-Changchun, Hefei University of Technology, Taiyuan University of Technology, University of Tokyo, Japan, Anna University, Chennai, Mangalore University, India, National Taiwan University, Indian Institute of Technology, Delhi, and Indian institute of Technology, Hyderabad, area few who have honored Prof. Chennupati with the honorary position in their respective departments.

He is an active member of IEEE Australian Material Research Societv where he was President (2019-2022). He was also President, IEEE Photonics Society (2018-2019), and President, IEEE Nanotechnology Council (2008-2009), and regularly speaks at international conferences and meetings on Material Sciences, Photonics, Electronics, Semiconductors, Quantum Electronics, Physics, etc. He has also delivered plenary talks, and guest talks and organized several sessions in MRS, IEEE meetings around the globe.

He is now serving as Editor-in-Chief for Applied Physics Reviews (January 2020 – present). Before joining APR, he served as Editor-in-Chief for Progress in Quantum Electronics (2016-2019), and as Co-Editor-in-Chief for the International Journal of High Speed Electronics and Systems (2014-2019). He also holds Editor position for various journals including IEEE Electron Device Letters (2008-2014), Journal of Semiconductor Technology and Science (2009–present), Springer Series in Material Science, (2009–present), Springer Series in Nanooptics and Nanophotonics (2009–present), Elsevier Series in Semiconductors and Semimetals (2010–present), Light: Science and Applications of Nature Publishing Group, (2014-2019). He is the member of the Editorial Board for more than 20 other journals, including ACS Nano, IEEE Photonics Journal, IEEE Nanotechnology Magazine, Physica Status Solidi: Rapid Res. Lett., Solid State Electronics, Etc.

Social Services 
Jagadish and his wife Vidya have launched The Chennupati and Vidya Jagadish Endowment to support students and researchers from developing countries to visit Australian National University's Research School of Physics.

Awards 
Jagadish has received many awards and honours including being elected a Fellow of the American Physical Society in 2003. He was awarded the Federation Fellowship (2004–2009) and Laureate Fellowship (2009–2014) by the Australian Research Council.
He was awarded the 2013 Walter Boas Medal from the Australian Institute of Physics. and the 2015 IEEE Pioneer Award in Nanotechnology.

He was named a Companion of the Order of Australia for eminent services to physics and engineering in the Australia Day Honours 2016., and received the UNESCO medal for his contributions to nanoscience and nanotechnologies, and the 2019 Thomas Ranken Lyle Medal from the Australian Academy of Science 2019 was the same year he received the Beattie Steel Medal, Australian Optical Society, and the IEEE Education Award of Electron Devices Society 2, 2019.

In 2020, he was elected an international member of the National Academy of Engineering for contributions to nanotechnology for optoelectronic devices.

References

External links
 https://www.science.org.au/news-and-events/news-and-media-releases/humble-beginnings-australian-science-leader
 https://physics.anu.edu.au/people/profile.php?ID=106
 https://web.archive.org/web/20160220083717/http://sites.ieee.org/nanotech/2015-ntc-award-winners-announced/
 https://web.archive.org/web/20160220083756/http://sites.ieee.org/nanotech/category/awards/
 https://web.archive.org/web/20160127190712/http://photonicssociety.org/sites/default/files/EA%20Recipient_2.pdf
 http://www.anu.edu.au/giving/support-us/chennupati-and-vidya-jagadish-endowment
 http://www.anu.edu.au/news/all-news/physics-that-benefits-humanity
 https://web.archive.org/web/20151227064502/http://photonicssociety.org/newsletters/aug10/ServiceAward.html

1957 births
Living people
Australian physicists
Companions of the Order of Australia
Academic staff of the Australian National University
Delhi University alumni
Queen's University at Kingston alumni
Fellows of the Australian Academy of Science
Fellows of Optica (society)
Fellows of the American Physical Society
Fellows of the Australian Academy of Technological Sciences and Engineering
Foreign Fellows of the Indian National Science Academy
Indian emigrants to Australia